HMS Camel was the mercantile Yorkshire, which the Royal Navy purchased for use as a sixth-rate frigate. She captured a few merchant vessels in the West Indies, but spent most of her service escorting convoys across the Atlantic. She was converted to an armed transport in 1782–83. The Navy sold her in 1784.

Merchantman
Yorkshire appeared in Lloyd's Register for 1777 with T.Hammond, master and owner, and trade Whitby transport. She had been launched at Whitby in 1776.

Royal Navy
The Navy purchased Yorkshire in 1776, renamed her Camel, and had her undergo fitting at Deptford. Commander William Finch commissioned her in November. Finch received promotion to post captain in March 1777 and on 27 March sailed her to the Leeward Islands. She arrived at New York on 28 May with the bulk of her convoy.
 
On 7 September the  intercepted a British convoy and engaged . In the ensuing battle she damaged Druid, but the approach of the other British escorts, Camel and  forced Raleigh to retire.

In December 1777 Captain Richard Bligh replaced Finch. Bligh sailed Camel to Jamaica on 27 January 1778.

Prior to 24 July 1778 Camel sent into Jamaica a homeward-bound French snow carrying coffee and indigo.

Then on 30 September Camel captured the snow Soigneux of the west end of Hispaniola. Soigneux,  Elie Dumas,
master, and Pierre Menorie of Bourdeaux, owner, was of 400 tons (bm), two guns, and 27 men. She was carrying sugar, coffee, etc. from St Louis, Hispaniola, to Port-au-Prince and Bourdeaux.

On April 2, 1779 Camel captured Hirondelle, Mathew Lupagerie, master, and Manneau of Port-au-Prince, owner, off Cape Antonio in Cuba. She was of 150 tons (bm), had a crew of 16 men, and was armed with four guns. She was carrying a cargo of sugar, coffee, taffia, melasses, and salt from Port-au-Prince to Baltimore.

In January 1780 Captain John Pakenham replaced Bligh with Camel operating in home waters.

Camel was paid off in July 1782. She then underwent fitting at Woolwich until January 1783 for service as an armed transport. Lieutenant George Burleton took command in November 1782 and recommissioned Camel in April 1783 as an armed transport. He sailed her for North America on 24 May 1783.

Fate
Camel was paid off in July 1784. She was sold at Deptford on 27 August 1784 for £1,500 in a private sale.

Citations and references
Citations

References
 

1776 ships
Ships built in Whitby
Age of Sail merchant ships of England
Sixth rates of the Royal Navy
Ships of the Royal Navy